Dissimilatory sulfite reductase is an enzyme that participates in sulfur metabolism in dissimilatory sulfate reduction.

The enzyme is essential in prokaryotic sulfur-based energy metabolism, including sulfate/sulfite reducing organisms, sulfur-oxidizing bacteria, and organosulfonate reducers. In sulfur reducers it catalyses the reduction of sulfite to sulfide (reaction 1), while in sulfur oxidizers it catalyses the opposite reaction (reaction 2). The reaction involves the small protein DsrC, which is present in all the organisms that contain dissimilatory sulfite reductase. During the process an intramolecular trisulfide is formed between two L-cysteine residues of DsrC and the sulfur atom from sulfite.  This trisulfide can be reduced by a number of proteins including DsrK and TcmB.

Reaction in organisms performing dissimilatory sulfate reduction:
 (1) sulfite + a [DsrC protein]-dithiol + 2 reduced acceptor + 2 H+ = hydrogen sulfide + a [DsrC protein]-disulfide + 2 acceptor + 3 H2O (overall reaction)
 (1a) sulfite + a [DsrC protein]-dithiol + 2 reduced acceptor + 2 H+ = a [DsrC protein]-S-sulfanyl-L-cysteine + 2 acceptor + 3 H2O
 (1b) a [DsrC protein]-S-sulfanyl-L-cysteine = hydrogen sulfide + a [DsrC protein]-disulfide

Reaction in organisms performing sulfur oxidation:
 (2) a [DsrC protein]-S-sulfanyl-L-cysteine + 3 acceptor + 3 H2O = sulfite + a [DsrC protein]-disulfide + 3 reduced acceptor + 2 H+ (overall reaction)
 (2a) a [DsrC protein]-S-sulfanyl-L-cysteine + 3 acceptor + 3 H2O = a [DsrC]-S-sulfo-L-cysteine + 3 reduced acceptor + H+
 (2b) a [DsrC]-S-sulfo-L-cysteine = sulfite + a [DsrC protein]-disulfide

The systematic name of this enzyme class is hydrogen-sulfide:[DsrC sulfur-carrier protein],acceptor oxidoreductase.

This enzyme is different from EC 1.8.1.2, assimilatory sulfite reductase (NADPH), and EC 1.8.7.1, assimilatory sulfite reductase (ferredoxin), which are involved in sulfate assimilation.

References 

EC 1.8.99
Iron enzymes
Sulfur metabolism